Apparition of the Virgin to St. Bernard is a painting by the Italian Renaissance painter Filippino Lippi, completed around 1485–1487. It is housed in the Badia Fiorentina, a church in Florence.

The picture was commissioned for the chapel of Francesco del Pugliese by the latter's son Piero, who is portrayed in the lower right corner in the traditional praying posture of the donor portrait.

It is one of the most admired Lippi's works, due to its powerful, Flemish-inspired chromatism and attention to details, which contribute in turning the mystical apparition of the Virgin to St. Bernard into an everyday life scene. The composition is set in a rocky landscape in which the saint, while writing on his lectern, is suddenly visited by the Virgin. Behind Bernard's shoulders is depicted the demon biting his chains: this is a reference to a medieval hymn celebrating the Virgin as the liberator of humanity from the chains of their sins.

A scroll on a rock contains a verse by the 3rd century AD stoic writer Epictetus: Sustine et abstine ("Carry on and abstain"), a hint to Bernard's teachings.

Some scholars have identified in the faces of the Virgin and the angels on the left the portraits of the donor's wife and sons.

References
Page at artonline.it

Footnotes

1480 paintings
Paintings by Filippino Lippi
Paintings of the Virgin Mary
Books in art
Angels in art